Cornelis Willem "Gordon" Heuckeroth (born 6 July 1968), known simply as Gordon, is a Dutch singer and television personality. Internationally, he is best known for his membership of the supergroup the Toppers, which represented the Netherlands in the Eurovision Song Contest 2009 with the song "Shine". He left the group in 2011.

Career

In 1990, Heuckeroth came third in the Nationaal Songfestival. In 1991, he had a Dutch number one hit with the single "Kon ik maar even bij je zijn" (If only I could be with you for just a while). In 2003, Heuckeroth again participated in the Nationaal Songfestival, finishing second after Esther Hart.

Heuckeroth joined Dutch singers Gerard Joling and René Froger in a series of concerts under the name the Toppers. The Toppers represented the Netherlands in the Eurovision Song Contest 2009 in Moscow, Russia, but did not qualify for the final, finishing in seventeenth place in the semi-final. In 2009, Heuckeroth left the Toppers, but re-joined the group a few weeks later. He permanently left the group in 2011.

Radio and television 

From 2007 to 2008, Heuckeroth had his own radio show on Radio 538.  On television, he was part of the jury of Idols in 2007, X Factor from 2009 to 2013, Holland's Got Talent from 2010 to 2017, and The Voice Senior in 2018.

In 2013, Heuckeroth received widespread criticism for a viral video in which he is seen making racist jokes about a Chinese Holland's Got Talent contestant.

Other activities 
In March 2021, Heuckeroth presented a petition to Sander Dekker, caretaker Minister for Legal Protection, calling for an identification requirement for social media accounts. He wanted an end to anonymous threats and homophobia that he and others had received. Dekker called it an interesting proposal that he would take up with European colleagues.

Discography
Kon Ik Maar Even Bij Je Zijn (CNR Music, 1992)
Alles Wat Ik Ben (1993)
Now Is The Time (CNR Music, 1994)
Kon Ik Maar Even Bij Je Zijn (2 CD; 1995)
Je Bent Wie Je Bent Schatje (1995)
De Tijd Van Mijn Leven (1996)
Omdat Ik Zo Van Je Hou (CNR Music, 1996)
Gordon & Re-Play (Dino Music, 2002) featuring Re-Play
Gordon & (Dino Music, 2003)
A Song For You (Rodeo Media, 2008)
Liefde Overwint Alles (Berk Music, 2013)
Compleet, Volmaakt, Het Einde (Berk Music, 2016) featuring Metropole Orkest

References

External links

 Official website 
 Article about Gordons discriminatory remark  'number 39 with rice' in BBC China

1968 births
Living people
Dutch male singers
Dutch television presenters
Dutch radio personalities
Dutch gay musicians
Musicians from Amsterdam
Members of the People's Party for Freedom and Democracy
Eurovision Song Contest entrants for the Netherlands
Eurovision Song Contest entrants of 2009
Gay singers
Dutch LGBT singers
De Toppers members
Nationaal Songfestival contestants